Grigori Mikhailovich Sokolovsky (born 26 September 1972 in Tyumen) is a former Russian football player.

References

1972 births
People from Tyumen
Living people
Soviet footballers
Russian footballers
FC Tyumen players
Russian Premier League players
Association football goalkeepers
Sportspeople from Tyumen Oblast